The Superior-Greenstone District School Board (known as English-language Public District School Board No. 6B prior to 1999) is a public school board in the Canadian province of Ontario, with jurisdiction for the operation of schools in eastern Thunder Bay District.

Superior-Greenstone District School Board is located in Northwestern Ontario and covers a vast area of 45,100 square kilometres. The board is responsible for providing public education, and its 15 schools serve the communities of Beardmore, Geraldton, Longlac, Nakina, Dorion, Nipigon, Red Rock, Schreiber, Terrace Bay, Marathon and Manitouwadge. Its head office is located in Marathon, on the north shore of Lake Superior.

The Superior-Greenstone District School Board has about 1,583 students in 10 elementary schools and 5 secondary schools.

Elementary schools
B.A. Parker Public School, Geraldton
Beardmore Public School, Beardmore
Dorion Public School, Dorion
George O'Neill Public School, Nipigon
Manitouwadge Public School, Manitouwadge
Margaret Twomey Public School, Marathon
Marjorie Mills Public School, Longlac
Nakina Public School, Nakina
Schreiber Public School, Schreiber
Terrace Bay Public School, Terrace Bay

Secondary schools
Geraldton Composite High School, Geraldton
Lake Superior High School, Terrace Bay
Manitouwadge High School, Manitouwadge
Marathon High School, Marathon
Nipigon-Red Rock District High School, Red Rock

See also
List of school districts in Ontario
List of high schools in Ontario

References

Education in Thunder Bay District
School districts in Ontario